Eugeniusz Bedeniczuk (born January 6, 1961 in Lachy, Podlaskie) is a former male triple jumper from Poland, who represented his native country at the 1992 Summer Olympics in Barcelona, Spain. He set his personal best (17.08 m) in the men's triple jump event in 1992.

Competition record

References

 sports-reference

1961 births
Living people
Polish male triple jumpers
Athletes (track and field) at the 1992 Summer Olympics
Olympic athletes of Poland
People from Hajnówka County
Sportspeople from Podlaskie Voivodeship
Jagiellonia Białystok athletes